The 19th congressional district of Illinois was a congressional district in Illinois. It was eliminated as a result of the 2010 US census, as population growth in Illinois was slower compared to other states. The district became obsolete for 2013's 113th Congress. It was last represented by Republican John Shimkus, who was redistricted to the 15th district.

In its last iteration, the district encompassed a large stretch of rural Southern Illinois, part of Springfield and a portion of the "Metro-East" area (the Illinois side of the Greater St. Louis, Missouri region).

List of members representing the district

Recent election results in statewide races
The district had a Cook Partisan Voting Index score of "R+9."

References

 Congressional Biographical Directory of the United States 1774–present

External links
Washington Post page on the 19th District of Illinois
U.S. Census Bureau - 19th District Fact Sheet

19
Former congressional districts of the United States
Bond County, Illinois
Clay County, Illinois
Clinton County, Illinois
1873 establishments in Illinois
Constituencies established in 1873
2013 disestablishments in Illinois
Constituencies disestablished in 2013